Tukumana Te Taniwha (1862/63–1941) was a notable New Zealand Māori tribal leader and historian. He was a leader of the Ngāti Maru and Ngāti Whanaunga iwi. He was born in the Coromandel, New Zealand in probably 1862 or 63. His mother, Karukino Te Taniwha, was the daughter of Te Horeta Te Taniwha.

Early life 
Writing in his 1929 manuscript entitled ‘Marutūahu’, Tukumana states that he was 11 years of age when he attended the great Ngāti Paoa hākari (feast) which took place in 1874. This means that Tukumana was born in 1863, during the first year of the Waikato War.

Tukumana’s father was Reihana Poto, of Ngāti Whanaunga and Ngāti Maru, and his mother was Karukino Te Taniwha of Ngāti Whanaunga. Karukino was a daughter of Te Hōreta Te Taniwha and a half sister to Hori Ngakapa Te Whanaunga.

References

1862 births
1941 deaths
20th-century New Zealand historians
Ngāti Maru (Hauraki)
Ngāti Whanaunga
People from Coromandel Peninsula